Shirehampton Football Club is a football club based in Bristol, England. They are currently members of the Western League Division One and play at Penpole Lane, Bristol.

History
Shirehampton were formed as Kingsweston Star, changing their name to Penpole United in 1952, joining the Church of England League. In 1954, the club once again changed their name to Shirehampton Sports, whilst competing in the Bristol and District League. In the early 1970s, the club changed their name to their current guise. In the early 1980s, Shirehampton entered the Somerset County League. In 2000, Shirehampton won the Somerset County League, winning it again in 2011 as well as the Somerset County Cup that year and 2015. In 2020, Shirehampton joined the Gloucestershire County League. 

In 2022, the club was admitted into the Western League Division One.

Ground
The club currently play at Penpole Lane, in the Shirehampton area of Bristol. During the 2021–22 season, Shirehampton entered a groundsharing agreement with Bristol Manor Farm at The Creek, whilst Shirehampton undertook ground improvements at Penpole Lane.

References

Association football clubs established in 1952
1952 establishments in England
Football clubs in England
Football clubs in Bristol
Bristol and District Football League
Somerset County League
Gloucestershire County Football League
Western Football League